The 1898 United States House of Representatives elections in South Carolina were held on November 8, 1898 to select seven Representatives for two-year terms from the state of South Carolina.  Six Democratic incumbents were re-elected and the open seat was retained by the Democrats.  The composition of the state delegation after the election was solely Democratic.

1st congressional district
Incumbent Democratic Congressman William Elliott of the 1st congressional district, in office since 1897, defeated Republican challenger George W. Murray.

General election results

|-
| 
| colspan=5 |Democratic hold
|-

2nd congressional district
Incumbent Democratic Congressman W. Jasper Talbert of the 2nd congressional district, in office since 1893, defeated Republican challenger B.P. Chatfield.

General election results

|-
| 
| colspan=5 |Democratic hold
|-

3rd congressional district
Incumbent Democratic Congressman Asbury Latimer of the 3rd congressional district, in office since 1893, won the Democratic primary and defeated Republican challenger John R. Tolbert in the general election.

Democratic primary

General election results

|-
| 
| colspan=5 |Democratic hold
|-

4th congressional district
Incumbent Democratic Congressman Stanyarne Wilson of the 4th congressional district, in office since 1895, won the Democratic primary and defeated Republican challenger P.S. Suber in the general election.

Democratic primary

General election results

|-
| 
| colspan=5 |Democratic hold
|-

5th congressional district
Incumbent Democratic Congressman Thomas J. Strait of the 5th congressional district, in office since 1893, lost the Democratic primary. David E. Finley defeated William A. Barber in the runoff and then Finley defeated Republican John F. Jones in the general election.

Democratic primary

General election results

|-
| 
| colspan=5 |Democratic hold
|-

6th congressional district
Incumbent Democratic Congressman James Norton of the 6th congressional district, in office since 1897, defeated J. Edwin Ellerbe in the Democratic primary and Republican J.H. Evans in the general election.

Democratic primary

General election results

|-
| 
| colspan=5 |Democratic hold
|-

7th congressional district
Incumbent Democratic Congressman J. William Stokes of the 7th congressional district, in office since 1896, defeated Thomas F. Brantley in the Democratic primary and Republican James Weston in the general election.

Democratic primary

General election results

|-
| 
| colspan=5 |Democratic hold
|-

See also
United States House of Representatives elections, 1898
South Carolina gubernatorial election, 1898
South Carolina's congressional districts

References

"Report of D.H. Tompkins, Secretary of State, to the General Assembly of South Carolina." Reports and Resolutions of the General Assembly of the State of South Carolina. Volume I. Columbia, SC: The Bryan Printing Company, 1899, pp. 252–255.

United States House of Representatives
1898
South Carolina